Chitignano is a comune (municipality) in the Province of Arezzo in the Italian region Tuscany, located about  east of Florence and about  north of Arezzo.

Chitignano borders the following municipalities: Caprese Michelangelo, Chiusi della Verna, Subbiano.

Demographics

References

Cities and towns in Tuscany